Sheridan School District is a school district headquartered in Sheridan, Colorado, United States.

In addition to all of Sheridan, it includes portions of Englewood and Littleton.

Schools
 Sheridan High School
 Sheridan Middle School
 Fort Logan Elementary School
 Alice Terry Elementary School
 Early Childhood Center

References

External links
 Sheridan School District

School districts in Colorado
Education in Arapahoe County, Colorado
Littleton, Colorado